The castra of Aradul Nou was a fort in the Roman province of Dacia, located on the western side of defensive line of forts, limes Daciae. It is situated in the neighborhood of Aradul Nou in Arad, Romania.

Development and function
The large Dacian settlement, located on the southern edge of the present-day city of Arad, was burned down by the Roman army during the first Dacian war, between 101 - 102 AD. During the Second Dacian War (105-106 AD) Trajan also occupied the lands north of Marisus and incorporated them into the province of Dacia Superior. The Roman army built a fort on the territory of the present-day urban district of Aradul Nou ("New Arad"), which was initially probably occupied by legionary exillations. The auxiliary cohort, possibly stationed later in this fort, was responsible among other things for monitoring and securing the road connection from Micia to Partiscum, which followed the southern bank of the river Mureș towards the northwest.

Four found brick stamps of Legio XIII Gemina and Legio IIII Flavia Felix seem to at least confirm the identification of the site as a Roman military complex. The fortification was probably built in the early 2nd century by vexillations of these two legions. Their bricks were often found on the lower reaches of Mureș, for example in Bulci, Cladova, Periam, Sânnicolau Mare and Szeged. This is probably also evidence that the Romans had already brought this area under control at the beginning of their rule in Dacia. The brick stamps are now in the Museum of Archaeology and History (Romanian Muzeul de Arheologie și Istorie), in Arad. So far, however, most of the Roman fortifications have either not been studied at all or only to a limited extent (as of 2003).

Monument protection
The entire archaeological site, and in particular the fort, are protected as historical monuments under Act No. 422/2001, adopted in 2001, and are entered on the National List of Historical Monuments (Lista Monumentelor Istorice). The Ministry of Culture and National Heritage (Ministerul Culturii şi Patrimoniului Naţional), in particular the General Directorate of National Cultural Heritage, the Department of Fine Arts and the National Commission of Historical Monuments, and other important institutions subordinate to the Ministry, are responsible for the protection of the entire archaeological site and in particular the fort. Unauthorized excavations and the export of antique objects are prohibited in Romania.

Gallery

See also
List of castra

Notes

External links
Roman castra from Romania - Google Maps / Earth

References
 Nicolae Gudea:  Der Dakische Limes. Materialien zu seiner Geschichte. In: Jahrbuch des Römisch-Germanischen Zentralmuseums Mainz. 44, 2 (1997), S. 24 (PDF) (German).
 Nicolae Gudea: Limesul Daciei romanc de la Traianus la Aurelianus. In: Acta Musei Porolissensis 1. 1977, S. 109 (Romanian).

Roman legionary fortresses in Romania
History of Banat